The 1992–93 Washington Capitals season was the Capitals' 19th season of competition.

Offseason

Regular season
During the regular season, the Caps set a club record with nine 20-goal scorers, three of whom were defensemen (Sylvain Cote, Kevin Hatcher and Al Iafrate).

Washington tied the Boston Bruins and the New York Islanders for the fewest short-handed goals allowed, with just 8.

On Friday, November 13, 1992, the Caps lost on the road to the New Jersey Devils by a score of 3-0. It was the first time the Caps had been shut out in a regular-season game since Sunday, October 29, 1989, when they lost on the road to the Chicago Blackhawks by a score of 1-0. Prior to their loss to the Devils, the Caps had gone 245 consecutive regular-season games without being shut out.

Final standings

Schedule and results

Playoffs

Round 1: New York Islanders vs. Washington Capitals

Player statistics

Regular season
Scoring

Goaltending

Playoffs
Scoring

Goaltending

Note: GP = Games played; G = Goals; A = Assists; Pts = Points; +/- = Plus/minus; PIM = Penalty minutes; PPG=Power-play goals; SHG=Short-handed goals; GWG=Game-winning goals
      MIN=Minutes played; W = Wins; L = Losses; T = Ties; GA = Goals against; GAA = Goals against average; SO = Shutouts; SA=Shots against; SV=Shots saved; SV% = Save percentage;

Awards and records

Transactions

Draft picks
Washington's draft picks at the 1992 NHL Entry Draft held at the Montreal Forum in Montreal, Quebec.

Farm teams

See also
 1992–93 NHL season

References

External links
 

Wash
Wash
Washington Capitals seasons
Cap
Cap